The Mokrsko mine is one of the largest gold mines in Czech Republic and in the world. The mine is located in the center of the country in the Central Bohemian Region. The mine has estimated reserves of 3.2 million oz of gold.

References 

Gold mines in the Czech Republic